James Beresford may refer to:

James Beresford (writer) (1764–1840), British writer and clergyman
James Beresford (baseball) (born 1989), Australian baseball player
James Beresford (footballer) ( 1880), English footballer